Going Bongo is a 2015 comedy drama film directed by Dean Matthew Ronalds and produced by Brian Ronalds.  The film stars Ernest Napoleon and features Emanuela Galliussi, Nyokabi Gethaiga and Ashley Olds. It was filmed in Los Angeles and Tanzania.

Plot
A newly recruited American doctor "accidentally" volunteers to work in Tanzania, Africa for a month. The film is based on a true story of a French doctor who left Europe to work in Africa.

Cast

 Ernest Napoleon as Dr. Lewis Burger
 Emanuela Galliussi as Laura Carmenucci
 Ashley Olds as Marina Kezerian
 Nyokabi Gethaiga as Tina
 MacDonald Haule as Bahame
 Mariam Peter as Zola Mwandenga
 Evance Bukuku as Kaligo
 Gabriel Jarret as Brian Kaufman
 Jeff Joslin as Perry Weiss
 Betty Kazimbaya as Mama Mwandenga
 Ahmed Olotu as Yazidi
 Robert Sisko as Dr. Eliot Lerner
 Richard Halverson as Cyril Flaws
 Maiz Lucero as Dr. Trout
 Sauda Simba as Rose
 Meredith Thomas as Anne Lerner
 Milena Gardasevic as Coco Banaloche
 Felix Ryan as Armen
 Artem Belov as Marvin
 Jaykesh Biharilal Rathod as Indian Doctor
 Tasha Dixon as Gwen Kaufman
 D.A. Goodman as Man in Tuxedo
 Lisa Goodman as Aunt Tia
 Libertad Green as Lady in Evening Gown
 Serdar Kalsin as Uncle Hovan
 Amby Lusekelo as Hospital Clerk
 Mzome Mahmoud as Tende
 Robert McPhalen as Featured Background
 Maulidi Mfaume as Mob Leader
 Tukise Mogoje as Tende (voice)
 Casmir Mukohi Taxi Driver
 Dennis Nicomede Man in Tuxedo
 Abraham Ntonya Taxi Driver (voice)
 Charles Onesmo Thief
 Brian Ronalds Blossey Swanson
 Stephanie Ronalds Nurse Stephanie
 Queen Victoria of Sheba as Ma
 Anthony Skordi Pop
 Patrick Stalinski as Patrick Steel
 Sewell Whitney as Bill

Release
The movie had its London premiere at CineWorld Haymarket on 4 June 2015.

References

External links

Films about physicians
American comedy-drama films
Tanzanian comedy-drama films
2015 comedy-drama films
Films set in Tanzania
Films shot in Tanzania
Films shot in Los Angeles
2010s English-language films
2010s American films